Marko Šimić (born 23 January 1988) is a Croatian professional footballer who plays as a forward.

Club career
Šimić was born in Rijeka.

Negeri Sembilan
On 6 January 2017, Šimić joined Malaysia Premier League side Negeri Sembilan.

Melaka United
On 10 June 2017, Šimić signed with Melaka United after being dropped by Negeri Sembilan. He made his debut for Melaka United in a 1–1 draw against PKNS on 1 July 2017.

Persija Jakarta
On 27 December 2017, Šimić signed with Persija Jakarta after not reaching agreement with Kelantan FA. 
Šimić made his Persija debut in a pre-season friendly against Persika Karawang on 30 December.

On 8 January 2018, Šimić made his first goal for the club in a tournament 2018 Suramadu Super Cup against Madura United, as his team drew 2–2.

In 2018 Indonesia President's Cup, Šimić scored a brace in Persija's 3–0 final win over Bali United. He also won the best player title and became a top scorer with 11 goals at that tournament. On 28 February 2018, Šimić made his international goal for Persija with scored a hat-trick in a 4–1 AFC Cup win over Tampines Rovers, and a month later, he made his league debut in the 2018 Liga 1 for Persija on 23 March in a draw 0–0 against Bhayangkara. On 31 March, Šimić scored his first league goal for Persija in the first half 1–1 draw over Arema, and in the second half, he also scored for the team, he scored in the 52nd minute, in which Šimić scored 2 goals and Persija won over Arema 3–1 at the Gelora Bung Karno Stadium.

On 10 April 2018, in continuation  the AFC Cup competition, he scored a quat-trick as Persija claimed a 4–0 win over Johor Darul Ta’zim. Šimić also became the first player to scored a hat-trick twice and a quat-trick in 2018 AFC Cup. In 2018, Šimić brought Persija Jakarta to the eleventh Liga 1 champion. Šimić has won the Golden Boot award after he finished the 2019 season as the top goal-scorer in the Liga 1 with 28 goals.

On 2 October 2021, Šimić scored his goal for Persija against Persiraja Banda Aceh as his team won 1–0, Persija's victory over Persiraja was determined by a Šimić goal through a penalty kick in the 70th minute, Simic's goal is also his 50th record during strengthening with Persija Jakarta.

On 26 April 2022, Šimić terminates contract unilaterally with Persija after his salary was cut when 2020 Liga 1 was stopped.

International career
Šimić has represented Croatia internationally at U19, U20 and U21 level.

Career statistics

Club

Honours

Club
Daugava Daugavpils
 Latvian Cup: 2008

Becamex Bình Dương
 V.League 1: 2015
 Vietnamese Cup: 2015

Persija Jakarta
 Liga 1: 2018
 Indonesia President's Cup: 2018
Menpora Cup: 2021

Individual
 Indonesia President's Cup Top Goalscorer: 2018
 Indonesia President's Cup Best Player: 2018
 Liga 1 Top Goalscorer: 2019
 Liga 1 Team of the Season: 2019
 East Java Governor Cup Top Goalscorer: 2020
APPI Indonesia Soccer Awards Best Forward: 2019
APPI Indonesia Soccer Awards Best Goal: 2019
APPI Indonesia Soccer Awards Best XI: 2019
 Liga 1 Goal of the Month: December 2021

References

External links
 
 
 HLSZ 

1988 births
Living people
Footballers from Rijeka
Association football forwards
Croatian footballers
Croatia youth international footballers
Croatia under-21 international footballers
FC Daugava players
FC Khimki players
NK Lokomotiva Zagreb players
Vasas SC players
Ferencvárosi TC footballers
GKS Bełchatów players 
ND Mura 05 players
NK Inter Zaprešić players
Pordenone Calcio players
Becamex Binh Duong FC players
Dong Thap FC players
Long An FC players
Negeri Sembilan FA players 
Melaka United F.C. players
Persija Jakarta players
FK Radnički 1923 players
Latvian Higher League players
Russian Premier League players
Croatian Football League players
Nemzeti Bajnokság I players
Ekstraklasa players
Slovenian PrvaLiga players
Second Football League (Croatia) players
Serie C players
V.League 1 players
Malaysia Premier League players
Malaysia Super League players
Liga 1 (Indonesia) players
Serbian SuperLiga players
Croatian expatriate footballers
Croatian expatriate sportspeople in Latvia
Expatriate footballers in Latvia
Croatian expatriate sportspeople in Russia
Expatriate footballers in Russia
Croatian expatriate sportspeople in Hungary
Expatriate footballers in Hungary
Croatian expatriate sportspeople in Poland
Expatriate footballers in Poland
Croatian expatriate sportspeople in Slovenia
Expatriate footballers in Slovenia
Croatian expatriate sportspeople in Italy
Expatriate footballers in Italy
Croatian expatriate sportspeople in Vietnam
Expatriate footballers in Vietnam
Croatian expatriate sportspeople in Malaysia
Expatriate footballers in Malaysia
Croatian expatriate sportspeople in Indonesia
Expatriate footballers in Indonesia
Croatian expatriate sportspeople in Serbia
Expatriate footballers in Serbia